The Diocese of Delhi is one of the 30 diocese of the Malankara Orthodox Syrian Church.

History
First church in Delhi Diocese is St. Mary's Cathedral, Hauz Khas, New Delhi. In 1968 the St.Mary's Church is consecrated by Metropolitan Mathews Mar Athanasios. In 1975 the Holy Synod establishes Diocese of Delhi.

Timeline
 1942 A congregation is formed and liturgical worship started by Fr. Mathews (former Catholicos, Moran Mar Baselios Mar Thoma Mathews II)
 1944 Metropolitan Alexios Mar Theodosios of Kollam and the " Diocese outside Kerala" visits Delhi to explore the feasibility of building an Orthodox Church in the National capital.
 1952 During the second visit of Mar Theodosios, the congregation decides to take steps to construct a church of their own. The Delhi parish is formally launched. Fr. K.C Thomas (later the Metropolitan of Canada, U.K, and Europe Diocese, Thomas Mar Makarios) is appointed as the first resident Vicar of the parish of Delhi.
 1961 The Delhi Orthodox Syrian Church Society is registered with the threefold aim of establishing a place of worship for the parish, an educational institution, and a healthcare facility to the public.
 1964 The Foundation stone of the St. Mary's Church (later Cathedral) at Hauz Khas, is laid by the Patriarch of Antioch, Moran Mar Ignatius Yalkoub III with the participation of the Diocesan Metropolitan Mathews Mar Athanasios (who subsequently became the Catholicos, Moran Mar Baselios Mar Thoma Mathews I).
 1968 The St.Mary's Church is consecrated by the Diocesan Metropolitan, Mathews Mar Athanasios.
 1975 The Holy Synod establishes the new Diocese of Delhi.
 1976 Paulos Mar Gregorios takes charge as the Metropolitan of Delhi.
 1981 Foundation stone of the Delhi Orthodox center is laid by Paulos Mar Gregorios, the Metropolitan of the Diocese.
 1984 The Delhi Orthodox Centre is dedicated by the Catholicos, Baselios Mar Thoma Mathews I and is inaugurated by the Vice President of India, R. Venkataraman.
 1991 Job Mar Philoxenos joins the Diocese as the Assistant Metropolitan.
 1996 Paulose Mar Gregorios Metropolitan  enters the heavenly Abode
 2002 Job Mar Philoxenos is consecrated as the Metropoliton of Delhi Diocese on 26 December 2002
 2011 Job Mar Philoxenos Metropolitan enters the heavenly Abode on 20 November 2011.
 2012 Youhanon Mar Demetrios is consecrated as new Metropolitan of the Delhi Diocese on 7 October 2012
 2019 The Renovated Delhi Orthodox Centre is dedicated by Baselios Mar Thoma Paulose-II on 26-27 July 2019

Diocesan Metropolitan
 Paulos Mar Gregorios (1976–1996)
 Job Mar Philoxenos (1996–2011)
 Youhanon Mar Demetrios (2011 – present)

The Diocese today
Once the nucleus of the Orthodox Church in north India was formed in the capital of the country, the growth of parishes in adjacent centres was rapid and the establishment of the Diocese of Delhi followed in a few years. Outside Delhi, there are several parishes spread across the various States at Ambala, Alwar, Gurgaon, Kherti Nagar, Bharatpur, Gwalior, Jhansi, Dholpur, Agra, Dehradun, Hardwar, Bhatinda, Hanumangarh, Chandigarh, Ludhiana, Jalandhar, Hissar, Jaipur, Kanpur, Udaipur, Bhilwara, Banswara, Chittorgarh, Dungarpur, Pratapgarh, Singrauli, Obra., Renukoot, Varanasi, Ajmer, Kota, Rawat Bhatta, Lucknow, Rae Bareli, Allahabad, Jodhpur, Bikaner, and Jaisalmer. New congregations have also been started at BITS Pilani, and Pali. Allahabad has also witnessed an amicable settlement with the CNI Church, and a vicar has been nominated for the church there.

Today, there are thirteen parishes in and around Delhi alone – Hauz Khas, Janakpuri, Tughlaqabad, Sarita Vihar, Mayur Vihar-I, Mayur Vihar-III, Rohini, Dwarka, Dilshad Garden, Ghaziabad, Noida, Gurugram and Faridabad. Overall, there are sixty one parishes including some congregations looked after by one Ramban and thirty six priests, spread over Uttar Pradesh, Rajasthan, Madhya Pradesh, Haryana, Delhi and United Arab Emirates.

In 1975, the Delhi Diocese was constituted by the Holy Synod, along with the four other new dioceses of Madras, Bombay, Calcutta and America. The next year, Paulose Mar Gregorios took charge as the Metropolitan of Delhi. By 1985, the Diocesan headquarters moved to its own building, the Delhi Orthodox Centre in Tughlaqabad in South Delhi. An architecturally distinctive three-storey building, the centre was dedicated by Catholicos Baselios Mar Thoma Mathews I and inaugurated by the Vice-President of India, R Venkataraman, in November 1984. With the St. Thomas Chapel in the middle, the centre is the residence of the Metropolitan and houses, besides the secretariat of the Diocesan Council, a library, a publication unit, the People's Education Society, Sophia Society, Sarva Dharma Nilaya, Dhyan Mandir and Niti Santi Kendra, engaged in a variety of complementary activities. In 1991, the Diocese was strengthened by the arrival of Job Mar Philoxenos as the Assistant Metropolitan.

PARISH LIST
1) Agra St.Thomas Orthodox Church

2) Ajmer St.George Orthodox Church

3) Allahabad St.Thomas Orthodox Church

4) Alain St.Dionysius Orthodox Church

5) Ambala St.Thomas Orthodox Church

6) Bharatpur Mar Gregorios Orthodox Church

7) Bhiwadi Mar Gregorios Orthodox Church

8) Bikaner St.Marys Orthodox Church

9) Chandigarh St.Marys Orthodox Church

10) Dholpur St.Marys Orthodox Church

11) Dilshad Garden St.Stephens Orthodox Church

12) Dubai St.Thomas Orthodox Cathedral

13) Dwaraka St.George Orthodox Church

14) Faridabad St.Marys Orthodox Church

15) Ghaziabad St.Thomas Orthodox Church

16) Gurgaon St.Gregorios Orthodox Church

17) Gwalior St.Pauls Orthodox Church

18) Ganganagar St.George Orthodox Church

19) Haridwar St.George Orthodox Church

20) Hauz Khas St.Marys Orthodox Cathedral

21) Jaipur St.Thomas Orthodox Church

22) Jallander St.George Orthodox Church

23) Janakpuri Mar Gregorios Orthodox Church

24) Jabel Ali St.Gregorios Orthodox Church

25) Jhansi St.George Orthodox Church

26) Jodhpur Mar Gregorios Orthodox Church

27) Kanpur St.Marys Orthodox Church

28) Lucknow Mar Gregorios Orthodox Church

29) Ludhiana Mar Gregorios Orthodox Church

30) Mayur vihar St.Johns Orthodox Church

31) Mayur vihar St.James Orthodox Church

32) Meeret Mar Gregorios Orthodox Church

33) Noida Mar Gregorios Orthodox Church

34) Pali St.George Orthodox Church

35) Renukoott St.Thomas Orthodox Church

36) Rohini St.Basil Orthodox Church

37) Saritha Vihar St.Thomas Orthodox Church

38) Sharjah Mar Gregorios Orthodox Church

39) Singrauli Mar Gregorios Orthodox Church

40) Varanasi St.Marys Orthodox Church

41) V.K.I Area St.Marys Orthodox Church

42) Thughlabad St.Joseph Orthodox Church

References

External links
 Website of Malankara Orthodox Syrian Church

Malankara Orthodox Syrian Church dioceses
1976 establishments in Delhi